Yunayevo (Yunay) is a rural locality (a village) in Utyagulovsky Selsoviet, Zianchurinsky District, Bashkortostan, Russia. The population was 183 as of 2010. There are 2 streets.

Geography 
Yunayevo is located 77 km southeast of Isyangulovo (the district's administrative centre) by road. Utyagulovo is the nearest rural locality.

References 

Rural localities in Zianchurinsky District